Gangster is a novel by Lorenzo Carcaterra, published in 2001, narrating the life of Angelo Vestieri from the early 20th Century until his death, and his rise to power in the New York City underworld.

Plot summary 

The novel opens in 1996 as Gabe, now middle-aged, keeps watch over an old Angelo Vestieri on his hospital deathbed. Slipping back in time to the Depression, the narrative tracks the rise of the famed mob boss from a simple Italian immigrant to the most powerful man of Manhattan's underworld, when a ten-year-old Gabe, by chance, walks into Vestieri's bar. Vestieri takes the boy under his wing and ushers him into the world of organized crime. Gabe learns what it takes to rule an empire with his mentor, yet when the time comes for Gabe to take over Angelo's operation, he refuses, choosing a normal life despite his deep love for Vestieri.

Bibliography

References

2001 American novels
Novels by Lorenzo Carcaterra
Novels about organized crime in the United States
Novels set in New York City
Family saga novels
Ballantine Books books